Marko Jovanović (born 26 March 1988) is a Serbian professional footballer who plays as a centre-back for Bosnian Premier League club Borac Banja Luka.

Club career

Partizan
Jovanović signed his first professional contract with Partizan on 23 July 2007 alongside Branislav Stanić. Jovanović made his official debut for the club on 26 September 2007 in a Serbian Cup match against Rad in a 4–1 home win. Due to the Summer Olympic Games, Jovanović missed a few matches at the beginning of the 2008–09 season.

2008–09 season
On 23 October 2008, he played his first game for Partizan in European competitions against Sampdoria in the first round of the 2008–09 UEFA Cup group stage. He was also a starter against Sevilla on Ramón Sánchez Pizjuán Stadium in the defeat of his team's 3–0. During the 2008–09 season, Jovanović has played 19 appearances for Partizan, 16 in the league and 3 in the UEFA Cup.

2009–10 season
In the 2009–10 season, Jovanović was a first starter in the UEFA Europa League group stage against Toulouse on 3 December 2009. He was also a starter against Shakhtar Donetsk in the last match of the group stage of the Europa League in a win of his team of 1–0. On 27 March 2010, Jovanović scored a goal in the last minute of the match against BSK Borča in the victory of his team of 1–2. During the second part of the 2009–10 season, Jovanović was scouted by Monaco. In the second half of the 2009–10 Serbian SuperLiga season, he spent every minute on the field in Partizan.

2010–11 season
On 24 August 2010, Jovanović and his team entered at the group stage of the UEFA Champions League by beating Anderlecht. He played all six matches for Partizan in the qualifying for the Champions League. On 28 September 2010, against Arsenal, Jovanović fouled Marouane Chamakh and received a red card, but Vladimir Stojković saved the penalty. By the end of the 2010–11 season he won the Serbian Cup and the title of national champion.

Wisła Kraków

On 12 July 2011, Jovanović joined Polish Ekstraklasa champions Wisła Kraków on a five-year deal for an undisclosed fee from Partizan. He made his first league debut for Wisła on 9 September 2011, against Lech Poznań in 0–1 away win. On 3 November 2011, Jovanović made his debut in the Europa League for Wisła against Fulham at Craven Cottage as a substitute for Dudu Biton in the 88th minute. On 14 December 2011, he played a full match against Twente in the 6th leg of the 2011–12 UEFA Europa League group stage. After a dramatic ending, Wisła qualified to the round of 32. In the round of 32, Jovanović played both matches against Standard Liège, but Wisła did not get through because Standard won on away goals. During the 2011–12 season, he played 27 matches in all competitions.

On 24 January 2015, Jovanović was released from the club.

Voždovac
On 24 August 2015, Jovanović joined Voždovac on a one-year deal. He made his debut for Voždovac on 13 September 2015, against Javor Ivanjica. During the first part of the 2015–16 season, Jovanović played 12 matches in all competitions.

Return to Partizan
On 23 December 2015, Jovanović signed a two-and-a-half-year contract with Partizan, returning to his former team. On 21 February 2016, Jovanović made his league debut against OFK Beograd. On 11 May 2016, he scored a goal in the 2015–16 Serbian Cup final against Javor Ivanjica in a 2–0 win.

AEL
On 24 August 2017, Jovanović signed a two-year contract with Superleague Greece club AEL for an undisclosed fee. He left AEL after one season in June 2018.

Return to Voždovac
In the 2018–19 Serbian SuperLiga season, Jovanović returned to and played for Voždovac. He was a regular for the club in that season, playing 30 league games and scoring 1 league goal.

Borac Banja Luka
On 30 June 2019, Jovanović signed a one-year contract with Bosnian Premier League club Borac Banja Luka. He made his official debut for Borac on 20 July 2019, in a 0–0 away league draw against Željezničar. He scored his first goal for Borac in a 3–1 home league win against Velež Mostar on 29 September 2019. On 29 November 2019, Jovanović extended his contract with Borac until the June 2023. He won his first trophy with the club on 23 May 2021, getting crowned Bosnian Premier League champions one game before the end of the 2020–21 season.

International career
Jovanović made his international debut for the Serbia under-21 national team in a friendly match against Moldova on 21 August 2007.

He was included in the Serbian squad for the 2008 Beijing Olympic Games playing in all three group matches against Australia, Ivory Coast and Argentina before the team finished fourth in their respective group.

He was also a member of the Serbia U21 team that took part in the 2009 UEFA European Under-21 Championship in Sweden.

Career statistics

Club

Honours
Partizan
Serbian SuperLiga: 2007–08, 2008–09, 2009–10, 2010–11
Serbian Cup: 2007–08, 2008–09, 2010–11, 2015–16

Bnei Yehuda
Israel State Cup: 2016–17

Borac Banja Luka
Bosnian Premier League: 2020–21

References

External links

Marko Jovanović at Srbijafudbal

1988 births
Living people
Serbian footballers
Association football defenders
Serbia under-21 international footballers
Footballers at the 2008 Summer Olympics
Olympic footballers of Serbia
FK Teleoptik players
FK Partizan players
FK Voždovac players
Wisła Kraków players
Bnei Yehuda Tel Aviv F.C. players
Athlitiki Enosi Larissa F.C. players
FK Borac Banja Luka players
Serbian SuperLiga players
Ekstraklasa players
Israeli Premier League players
Premier League of Bosnia and Herzegovina players
Serbian expatriate footballers
Expatriate footballers in Poland
Expatriate footballers in Israel
Expatriate footballers in Bosnia and Herzegovina
Serbian expatriate sportspeople in Poland
Serbian expatriate sportspeople in Israel
Serbian expatriate sportspeople in Bosnia and Herzegovina